Jonathan M. Austyn is Professor of Immunobiology at the University of Oxford and a Fellow of Wolfson College, Oxford. He has taught immunology over many years, and designed the Master of Science course in Integrated Immunology at the University of Oxford, which he co-directs.

Education 
Austyn was educated at the University of Oxford where he was awarded a Doctor of Philosophy degre in for research investigating monoclonal antibodies against the murine macrophage supervised by Siamon Gordon.

Career and research 
Austyn has over 25 years research experience of dendritic cell immunology, particularly as applied to transplantation, infectious diseases and cancer. With Gordon MacPherson he co-authored the textbook Exploring Immunology: Concepts and Evidence.

Awards and honours 
Austyn was awarded with distinction the Diploma in Learning and Teaching in Higher Education by the University of Oxford.

References 

Fellows of Wolfson College, Oxford
Alumni of the University of Oxford
British immunologists
Year of birth missing (living people)
Living people